The Hukou Waterfall, is the largest waterfall on the Yellow River, the second largest waterfall in China (after the Huangguoshu Waterfall in Guizhou), and the world's largest yellow waterfall. Hence it gets the name Hukou (literally, "flask mouth") Waterfall.

When the Yellow River flows to this point, divides into two, rolling and roaring on and on from both sides of the rock before reconverging.

Beneath the waterfall is the Qilangwo Bridge which connects the two provinces of Shanxi and Shaanxi. In the sunshine, the mist is refracted by sunlight to create a rainbow spanning  the water like a colorful bridge. In 1991, Hukou Waterfall was named one of the "40 Best" national scenic spots.

Due to its awkward location in the Loess Plateau hinterlands, Hukou was once very difficult to access. After the local government improved transport and tourist facilities, the number of tourists rose from 20,000 in 1994 to 47,000 in 1995. The figure for 1996 reached 100,000 tourists.

An image of the Hukou Waterfall can be seen on the older fourth series of the renminbi 50 RMB banknote.

References
Hukou Waterfall at China.org.cn
Hukou Waterfall at Chinaculture.org I
Hukou Waterfall at Chinaculture.org II
Hukou Waterfall - Known to Elaborate Spirit of Chinese People

Foreigners are forbidden from visiting the falls.

External links 

Photo Album "Hukou waterfall of Yellow River"

Waterfalls of China
Landforms of Shanxi
Landforms of Shaanxi
Tourist attractions in Shanxi
Tourist attractions in Shaanxi